Alefein "Alefe" Santos D'Abadia (born 1 March 1995) is a Brazilian footballer who plays as a winger for Chippenham Town.

Early life
Santos was born in São Paulo before moving to England when he was 12 years old.

“My parents told me I would have a better chance here in the UK, and better opportunities to achieve my dream to become a professional footballer,” Santos said about his transition from Brazil to England."

Career

Bristol Rovers
Santos began his career at Stoke City as a schoolboy before joining Bristol Rovers on a two-year scholarship in the summer of 2011.  The next season, he made his professional debut whilst still considered a youth player on 20 November 2012, in a 4–0 defeat to Port Vale in Football League Two, coming on as a substitute for Fabian Broghammer after 60 minutes.

He signed his professional contract with the club on 23 April 2013. Santos became a regular player in the Bristol Rovers first team in the 2013–14 season, playing 27 matches, including 23 in the league, but his team were relegated to the Football Conference. On 12 October 2013, he scored his only goal for Bristol Rovers, in a 1–1 league draw with Mansfield Town at Field Mill; he came on for Andy Bond after 72 minutes and scored the equaliser 12 minutes later.

Derby County
He signed a two-year contract with the option of a third year at Derby County on 1 July 2014 after turning down a new contract with Bristol Rovers. He had previously been in discussions with Premier League club Hull City. Santos made his Derby debut on 26 August, replacing Johnny Russell for the last 20 minutes of a 1–0 League Cup victory over Charlton Athletic.

Notts County (loan)
Having not made another appearance since his debut, on 9 January 2015 Santos went on a one-month loan to League One club Notts County, and made a total of 3 appearances.

Eastleigh (loan)
On 10 November 2016, National League side Eastleigh announced that they had reached an agreement with Derby to sign Santos on a short-term loan until 2 January 2017. His loan was cut short after just 28 days, when Derby exercised their right to call him back from Eastleigh.

Yeovil Town
On 25 July 2017, following a successful trial period, Santos signed for League Two club Yeovil Town signing a two-year contract. At the end of the 2018–19 season, Santos was released by Yeovil following the club's relegation from the Football League.

Aldershot Town
On 5 July 2019, Santos agreed to join National League side, Aldershot Town on a one-year deal.

Weymouth
On 31 August 2020, Santos signed for newly-promoted National League side Weymouth. Santos left the club at the end of the season after making just eight appearances in all competitions.

Chippenham Town
On 21 June 2021, Santos joined National League South side Chippenham Town. Santos signed on for a second season in June 2022 following a record league finish for the club and defeat in the play-offs.

Playing style
Santos describes himself as "a very direct player who likes to run at the full-back and get crosses in and create chances for the team".

Career statistics

References

External links

1995 births
Living people
Footballers from São Paulo
Brazilian footballers
Brazilian expatriate sportspeople in England
Brazilian expatriate footballers
Association football midfielders
Bristol Rovers F.C. players
Derby County F.C. players
Notts County F.C. players
Eastleigh F.C. players
Yeovil Town F.C. players
Aldershot Town F.C. players
Weymouth F.C. players
Chippenham Town F.C. players
English Football League players
National League (English football) players
Expatriate footballers in England
Brazilian emigrants to England